Nikola Vasiljević (born 19 December 1983) is a retired Serbian professional footballer who played as a defender.

Honours
Red Star Belgrade
 Serbian Cup: 2009–10

External links
 Srbijafudbal profile
 
 
 

Association football defenders
Expatriate footballers in Bosnia and Herzegovina
Expatriate footballers in Romania
Expatriate footballers in Ukraine
FC Metalurh Zaporizhzhia players
FC UTA Arad players
FK Borac Banja Luka players
FK BSK Borča players
FK Leotar players
FK Radnički Beograd players
FK Radnički Obrenovac players
FK Radnički Pirot players
FK Srem players
FK Voždovac players
Liga I players
Premier League of Bosnia and Herzegovina players
Red Star Belgrade footballers
Serbian expatriate footballers
Serbian expatriate sportspeople in Bosnia and Herzegovina
Serbian expatriate sportspeople in Romania
Serbian expatriate sportspeople in Ukraine
Serbian First League players
Serbian footballers
Serbian SuperLiga players
Footballers from Belgrade
Ukrainian Premier League players
1983 births
Living people